Tirroan is a town and a locality in the Bundaberg Region, Queensland, Australia.

History 
The name Tirroan comes from the title of the first British pastoral property set up in the region, which was established by Gregory Blaxland Jnr and William Forster in 1848. It is possible that it is derived from the name of an Aboriginal stockman on this run, who later died of tuberculosis in 1880.
The town itself was initially known as West Albany but the name was changed on 3 August 1899.

References

Further reading

External links 
 Town map of Tirroan, 1964

Towns in Queensland
Bundaberg Region
Localities in Queensland